West Virginia Route 29 is a north–south state highway located in the Eastern Panhandle of West Virginia. The southern terminus of the route is at West Virginia Route 55 and West Virginia Route 259 (Corridor H) in Baker, Hardy County. The northern terminus is at West Virginia Route 9 three miles (5 km) south of Paw Paw in Hampshire County.

Route description

From Rio to Hanging Rock, WV 29 is named Delray Road for the community of Delray. This stretch was formerly known as North River Road (County Route 11) for the river it parallels. From Hanging Rock to the Augusta WV 29 wye fork, WV 29 runs concurrent with U.S. Route 50 and is referred to as the Northwestern Turnpike. From the Augusta WV 29 wye fork to the Forks of Cacapon West Virginia Route 127 wye fork, WV 29 is named the Bloomery Pike for Bloomery on WV 127. This route was known as the Martinsburg Grade.

Attractions
Rio Mall, Rio
Richards-Mowery House, Delray
Pin Oak Fountain, Pin Oak

Major intersections

References

029
West Virginia Route 029
Transportation in Hardy County, West Virginia